The 1986 West Lancashire District Council election took place on 1 May 1986 to elect members of West Lancashire District Council in Lancashire, England. One third of the council was up for election and the Conservative Party stayed in overall control of the council.

After the election, the composition of the council was:

Election results

References

1986
1986 English local elections
1980s in Lancashire
May 1986 events in the United Kingdom